"Happiness" is a song by The Pointer Sisters, written by Allen Toussaint, which was released in early 1979 as the second single from their 1978 LP, Energy.

"Happiness" became a top 40 hit in the U.S., Canada and New Zealand. It also reached No. 11 in The Netherlands and No. 8 in Belgium.

Charts

Weekly charts

Year-end charts

References

External links
 

1978 songs
1979 singles
The Pointer Sisters songs
Songs written by Allen Toussaint
Song recordings produced by Richard Perry
Planet Records singles
American soul songs